Metropolitan Vladimir (Volodymyr; secular name Viktor Markianovich Sabodan, November 23, 1935 – July 5, 2014) was the head of the Ukrainian Orthodox Church (Moscow Patriarchate) (UOC-MP) from 1992 to 2014.  Metropolitan Volodymyr's official title was His Beatitude Vladimir,  Metropolitan of Kyiv and all Ukraine. As head of the Ukrainian Orthodox Church (Moscow Patriarchate), he was the head of the only Ukrainian Church inside Ukraine to have canonical standing (legal recognition) in Eastern Orthodoxy worldwide.

Early life
Viktor Sabodan was born November 23, 1935 in a peasant family in Letychiv Raion of Vinnytsia Oblast (today - Khmelnytskyi Oblast).

In the late 1950s and early 1960s Sabodan studied at Odessa and later Leningrad Theological Seminary.

In 1965 Sabodan completed the post-graduate course at the Moscow Theological Academy and was appointed Rector of the Odessa Theological Seminary and elevated to the rank of Archimandrite. In 1966 he was appointed Deputy Head of the Russian Orthodox Ecclesiastical Mission in Jerusalem.

Episcopacy
In 1966 Sabodan was appointed Bishop of Zvenigorod. His episcopal consecration was conferred on July 9, 1966 by Pimen I of Moscow in the Trinity Lavra of St. Sergius. In 1969 he was nominated Bishop of Chernihiv and temporary administrator of Sumy Diocese. On September 9, 1973 he was elevated to the rank of Archbishop of Moscow Diocese and Rector of the Moscow Theological Academy and Seminary.
On July 16, 1982 he was appointed to Rostov-on-Don Diocese and elevated to the rank of Metropolitan. From 1984 he was Patriarchal Exarch of Western Europe, and from 1987, a permanent member of the Holy Synod, Chancellor of Moscow Patriarchate.
In 1992, he was elected by the Kharkiv Council of the Ukrainian Orthodox Church as Metropolitan of Kyiv, and Primate of the Ukrainian Orthodox Church. Later than year he was enthroned as Metropolitan of Kyiv and all Ukraine, replacing Metropolitan Filaret who was excommunicated for “participating in schismatic activities.”
 	
Sabodan was the author of numerous research papers on theology, the majority of which were included in the six-volume edition of his works published in 1997–1998.

Sabodan enjoyed singing and collected recordings of Ukrainian folk songs as well as stamps and postcards. He had no objections to a good meal.
 	
In January 2008, Sabodan performed the service of consecration of the altar and temple in Verkhovna Rada of Ukraine.

In 2011 Sabodan was awarded the title Hero of Ukraine.

Death
Sabodan died on July 5, 2014 from internal bleeding at the age of 78. Metropolitan Onuphrius was elected his successor on August 13, 2014.

State awards
 Hero of Ukraine (The Order of the State) (2011)

 The Order of Prince Yaroslav the Wise 1st (2008), 2nd (2005), 3rd (2002), 4th (2000) and 5th (1999) cl.

See also
 Ukrainian Orthodox Church (Moscow Patriarchate)
 History of Christianity in Ukraine

References

External links
Metropolitan Volodymyr
Died Metropolitan Volodymyr. Ukrayinska Pravda. July 5, 2014

1935 births
2014 deaths
People from Khmelnytskyi Oblast
First Hierarchs of the Ukrainian Orthodox Church (Moscow Patriarchate)
Bishops of Chernihiv
Recipients of the title of Hero of Ukraine
Recipients of the Order of Prince Yaroslav the Wise